Chionanthus albidiflorus (syn. Linociera albidiflora (Thwaites) C.B.Clarke) is a species of flowering plant in the family Oleaceae. It is endemic to Sri Lanka.

It is sometimes treated in the segregate genus Linociera, though this does not differ from Chionanthus in any character other than leaf persistence, not a taxonomically significant character.

Culture
Known as "ඇබුල් හොර කහ - ambul hora kaha" in Sinhala.

References

albidiflorus
Flora of Sri Lanka
Critically endangered plants
Taxonomy articles created by Polbot
Taxobox binomials not recognized by IUCN